The Hardy Bryan House, also known as Cater House, in Thomasville, Georgia, was built in c.1833.  It is a well-preserved example of an antebellum plantation house.  It was listed on the National Register of Historic Places in 1970.  It is also a contributing building in the National Register-listed Dawson Street Residential Historic District.

It is a two-and-a-half-story Plantation Style house with a two-story portico supported by four square columns.  As of 1970, all of its windows were 16 over 16, many with their original glass.

References

External links

Houses on the National Register of Historic Places in Georgia (U.S. state)
Houses in Thomas County, Georgia
Plantation houses in Georgia (U.S. state)
Houses completed in 1833
National Register of Historic Places in Thomas County, Georgia